Chal Mere Bhai is a 2000 Indian Hindi-language comedy film. The film was produced by Nitin Manmohan and directed by David Dhawan. It stars Sanjay Dutt, Salman Khan and Karishma Kapoor.

Plot 
Chal Mere Bai is the story of two brothers, Vikram "Vicky" Oberoi and Prem Oberoi and how their lives are turned upside down by a girl named Sapna.

Vicky is a business tycoon who runs his family's huge business empire. Sapna applies for the position of his secretary. She is an orphan who has just moved to Bombay from Pune and is currently living with her uncle and aunt and doesn't have the required experience to be Vicky's secretary, but Vicky's father, Balraj Oberoi is impressed by Sapna's passion and hires her.

Prem is an aspiring actor, much to the chagrin of Balraj, who would like Prem to also work for the family business. However, Prem's grandmother  and Vicky support Prem's decision to be an actor. He works with Sapna's uncle who is a theater director.

Sapna is very inefficient at work and annoys Vicky constantly with her clumsy behavior and incompetence. But when Vicky is attacked after work, it is Sapna's fast thinking that saves his life. Vicky's family invite her and her family to a short vacation on their farmhouse. Vicky's family become quite fond of Sapna. Prem and Sapna also fall in love during this time.

However, before Prem can tell his family that he loves Sapna, he finds out that his grandmother wants Vicky to marry Sapna and that Vicky has agreed to the proposal. Prem doesn't want to break his brother's heart. Vicky has been grieving for his late girlfriend, Piya for a very long time. Prem doesn't want to get in his way now that Vicky has finally decided to move on. Prem therefore falsely tells Sapna that he was just fooling around with her. A heartbroken Sapna gives in to the pressure of her aunt and uncle and agrees to marry Vicky. However, Vicky finds out the truth before the wedding and calls them out. Sapna and Prem are reunited at the end. The last scene implies that Vicky finds love again when a new girl, Pooja joins his office.

Cast 
 Sanjay Dutt as Vikram "Vicky" Oberoi
 Salman Khan as Prem Oberoi
 Karishma Kapoor as Sapna Mehra
 Dalip Tahil as Balraj Oberoi
 Sushma Seth as Dadima, Vicky and Prem's grandmother
 Shakti Kapoor as Mamaji, Sapna's uncle
 Ravi Baswani as Waiter in a guest appearance
 Anil Dhawan as Doctor in hospital
 Himani Shivpuri as Mamiji, Sapna's aunt
 Shahbaz Khan as Rakesh
 Javed Khan as Murari
 Asrani as Family doctor
 Nagma as Sonia, (guest appearance)
 Shankar Mahadevan as himself in the title sequence
 Lesle Lewis as himself in the title sequence
 Sonali Bendre as Piya, Vicky's beloved who died in an accident, (guest appearance)
 Twinkle Khanna as Pooja, (guest appearance)
 Birbal as Astrologer
 Ghanshyam Rohera as Nandu, the cook
 Shashi Kiran as Suri
 Masshe Uddin Qureshi
 Dinesh Anand
 Suresh Bhagwat

Soundtrack 

According to the Indian trade website Box Office India, with around 12,00,000 units sold, this film's soundtrack was the year's fifteenth highest-selling.

Reception 
Sharmila Taliculam of Rediff.com wrote that "Chal Mere Bhai is supposed to deliver a message on love, brotherhood, sacrifice and family values. But really, do you want to sit through another one? I suppose not. In that case, you can comfortably give this a miss". Taran Adarsh of IndiaFM gave the film 1 star out of 5, writing opined that "Director David Dhawan should've chosen a better script to work on. Those going to watch a typical David Dhawan kind of a masala film are bound to be disappointed this time. The film lacks in substance, which is its biggest flaw.At the box-office, CHAL MERE BHAI has weak merits and will find the going tough."

References

External links 

Planet Bollywood review

2000 films
2000s Hindi-language films
2000 romantic comedy films
Films set in India
Films scored by Anand–Milind
Films directed by David Dhawan
Indian romantic comedy films